Eric James may refer to:

 Eric James (cricketer, 1881–1948), Australian cricketer
 Eric James (cricketer, 1923–1999), Australian cricketer
 Eric James (priest) (1925–2012), Anglican clergyman
 Eric James, Baron James of Rusholme (1909–1992), English peer and academic

See also
 James (surname)